Republican Alternative (ALTER) is a Spanish political party formed in 2015 by the merger of various small left-wing republican parties. The Left Republican Party (Catalan: Partit Republicà d'Esquerra, PRE) is its branch in Catalonia.

History
AR was formed by Spanish Republican Democratic Action, a faction of Republican Left and the Catalan Left-wing Republican Party. The founding congress was held in Vallecas on May 25 and 26, 2013. In its Statutes AR is ideologically defined as left-wing, democratic, republican, radical, secular, federalist and environmentalist.

In the municipal elections of 2015 AR gained 2 local councillors, Pedro Gómez in Segorbe (Valencian Community) and Gabriel Salguero Lafuente in Montgat (Catalonia).

References

Political parties established in 2013
2013 establishments in Spain
Republican parties in Spain